Czech Airlines (abbreviation: ČSA) is the flag carrier of the Czech Republic. Its head office is located in the Vokovice area of Prague's 6th district and its hub is Václav Havel Airport Prague. The company mainly operates scheduled flights, serving four destinations as of 2023.

When, in 2018, 97.74% of Czech Airlines was bought by the privately owned Smartwings, ČSA became a part of the Smartwings Group. The remaining 2.26% of ČSA was owned by insurance company Česká Pojišťovna. The airline runs a frequent flyer programme called "OK Plus" in reference to the airline's International Air Transport Association designation, as well as the term of approval; OK also featured prominently in its previous livery, and is the prefix of Czech Republic aircraft registrations. It is a member of the SkyTeam alliance. 

ČSA is the fifth oldest airline in the world, after Dutch KLM (1919), Colombian Avianca (1919), Australian Qantas (1920), and Soviet/Russian Aeroflot (1923). It was the first airline in the world to fly regular jet-only routes (between Prague and Moscow).

ČSA filed for bankruptcy in March 2021 and went through an extensive business restructuring, exiting in June 2022. Currently, ČSA is under a new ownership structure with a new parent company called Prague City Air s.r.o. owning 70% of the company, with Smartwings retaining the remaining 30%. The airline currently operates flights to one destination.

History

Early years
ČSA was founded on 6 October 1923 by the Czechoslovak government as ČSA Československé státní aerolinie (Czechoslovak State Airlines). Twenty-three days later, its first transport flight took place, flying between Prague and Bratislava. It only operated domestic services until its first international flight from Prague to Bratislava and on to Zagreb in Yugoslavia in 1930. After the dismemberment of Czechoslovakia in 1939 and the splitting of the country into three parts, the airline was dissolved.

Following a coup in February 1948, the Czechoslovak Communist Party suspended some of ČSA's western European and Middle Eastern routes and also gradually replaced much of the fleet with Soviet-built airliners, due to the embargo imposed by the West on the western-built aircraft spares and other equipment. The Ilyushin Il-14 was updated and built under licence in Czechoslovakia as the Avia-14.

In 1950, ČSA became the world's first victim of a mass hijacking. Three Czechoslovak Douglas DC-3 airliners flown to an American air base in Erding, near Munich, stirred the world on both sides of the "burnt through" Iron Curtain and the case intensified the Cold War between East and West overnight. On the morning of 24 March, the three aircraft landed near Munich instead of at Prague; the first from Brno, at 08:20, the second from Moravská Ostrava at 08:40, and the third from Bratislava at 09:20. Two-thirds of the people on board were unwilling participants and later returned to Czechoslovakia. The Czechoslovak Communist government commissioned a 'flight to freedom' book, stage play, and film (all bearing the name Kidnap to Erding) which celebrated the kidnapped returnees as heroes who had not allowed themselves to be swayed by promises of capitalist opulence. Those who remained and requested political asylum in West Germany were proclaimed criminals for whom the Prague government vigorously requested extradition – in vain. The pilot from Brno was Josef Klesnil, a former Royal Air Force pilot with 311 squadron, who flew from Brno to Erding with a pistol pointed at his head.

In 1957, ČSA became the third airline to fly jet services, taking delivery of and putting into service the very first Tupolev Tu-104A that year. ČSA was the only airline other than Aeroflot to operate the Tu-104. The Tu-104A service that began in 1957 between Prague and Moscow was the first jet-only connection (other airlines used both jets and piston/turboprop aircraft). The airline's first transatlantic services started on 3 February 1962 with a flight to Havana using a Bristol Britannia turboprop leased from Cubana de Aviación. ČSA's transatlantic flights were code-shared with Cubana's services to Prague, and Cubana's crews provided initial training and assistance in the operation of the Britannias.

1960 to 1990
From the late 1960s, ČSA used a range of Soviet-built aircraft and modified versions of them for its extensive European and intercontinental services which totaled some 50 international and 15 domestic destinations. The Britannia was replaced with long-range Ilyushin Il-18D turboprops at this time, and transatlantic routes were established to Montreal and New York City in addition to Havana. Along with the Il-18D, aircraft in ČSA's fleet included the short-range Tupolev Tu-134, medium-range Tupolev Tu-154, and long-range Ilyushin Il-62. As with several other airlines, the Il-62 was the first long-range jet airliner to be put into operation by ČSA (also the first foreign customer to buy Il-62s from the USSR). ČSA operated a fleet of 21 Il-62s between 1969 and 1997, including six Il-62Ms. A ČSA-registered Il-62 and three Il-62Ms were used as official Czechoslovak and Czech government transports between 1974 and 1996.

After absorbing the "heavier" part of Slov-Air and taking its Let L-410A Turbolet turboprop commuters into its fleet in the early 1970s, ČSA partner airliner Slov-Air became the world's first to have a captain, Ján Mičica, slain at the controls by a hijacker, during a hijacking to West Germany. The aircraft involved, OK-ADN, is currently displayed in an open-air aircraft museum in Martin, Slovakia.

The 1990s and 2000s

After the breakup of the Czechoslovak Federation, the airline in May 1995 adopted its present name. By the late 1990s, most of its Soviet aircraft had either been sold to other airlines or retired (a number were preserved), replaced with Western models such as the Boeing 737, Airbus A310 and Airbus A320. ČSA became a full member of the SkyTeam alliance on 18 October 2000. As of March 2007, the airline, with 5,440 employees, was owned by the Czech Ministry of Finance (56.92%), Czech Consolidation Agency (34.59%), and other Czech institutions.

On 1 January 2010, the whole non-office ground staff of ČSA was transferred to the ČSA Support subsidiary, now named Czech Airlines Handling S.R.O. In February 2010, ČSA sold off its duty-free shops to another entity.

EU competition regulators began an investigation into Czech Airlines on 23 February 2011, stating that it doubted the loss-making concern could return to viability and comply with European Union state aid regulations.

In late 2012, ČSA Czech Airlines announced expansion plans and the resumption of long-haul flights from summer 2013 with Airbus A330 aircraft between Prague and Seoul. Starting in March 2013, it operated direct flights from Prague to Perm, Nice, Munich, Zurich, Seoul, and Florence.

After stock sales to Korean Air on 10 April 2013, ČSA Czech Airlines was owned by Czech Aeroholdings a.s. (56%) and Korean Air Lines Co., Ltd. (44%). On May 14, 2013, Czech Airlines Extraordinary General shareholders' meeting elected Cho Won-tae as a new member of its supervisory board. Cho replaced Petr Matousek, who resigned from his position on the supervisory board. This personnel change took effect on 1 June 2013 as a result of Korean Air's equity purchase.

In April 2015, Travel Service Group bought 34% of the airline, over which Korean Air had an option. In 2016, the airline returned to profit for the first time in several years.

On 6 October 2017, Korean Air announced the sale of its 44 percent stake in Czech Airlines, which it had held for four years, to Travel Service. Travel Service by then owned 78.9 percent of ČSA. Czech state company Prisko owned 20 percent of ČSA. Travel Service later also acquired Prisko's stake, increasing its stake to 97.74%.

Latest developments
In March 2019, Smartwings announced that ČSA would undergo a fleet transition, with the Airbus A319 and ATR 72 to be retired. In October 2019, Czech Airlines announced an order for four Airbus A220-300 and three A321XLR, which had been converted from orders for the A320neo. But in August 2021, Czech Airlines announced the orders' cancellation.

In the wake of the COVID-19 pandemic, Czech Airlines announced in April 2020 the end of its already suspended sole long-haul route to Seoul. Thus its sole Airbus A330 was to be returned to lessor Korean Air by October 2020.

During the COVID-19 pandemic ČSA fell into insolvency, applying for a moratorium in August 2020. In February 2021, a maintenance provider ordered the seizure of two Czech Airlines' ATR 72-500 in Prague over unpaid debts. Prior to the incident, near the end of the moratorium, majority owner Smartwings announced that Czech Airlines faced insolvency should it not receive state financial aid, but the aid raised controversy. That same month, the airline notified the Czech Republic's Employment Office that it might lay off its entire workforce of some 430 people. In March 2021, it added that it had no means to meet its financial obligations and filed for bankruptcy.

In March 2021, ČSA announced the immediate retirement of all ATR 72-500 aircraft, considerably shrinking its remaining fleet. At the end of August 2021, ČSA was operating just one Airbus A320 aircraft; the second was inoperable. As of summer 2022, Czech Airlines had reduced its network to just three scheduled routes.

In June 2022, ČSA exited business restructuring under a new ownership structure. Prague City Air, founded under the aid of Smartwings shareholders Jiří Šimáně and Roman Vik, was created to own 70% of ČSA while current majority shareholder Smartwings retained 30%. The airline now plans to rebuild its fleet and route network using Airbus A320 and Airbus A220 aircraft.

Corporate affairs

Head office
In 2016, Czech Airlines head office moved to Evropská Street in 6th district, Prague, Vokovice district to lower overhead. Czech Airlines formerly had its head office, the APC Building, on the grounds of Václav Havel Airport Prague in Ruzyně, 6th district, Prague. On 30 December 2009, ČSA announced it would sell its head office to the airport for CZK 607 million. Prior to the insolvency application, in February 2021, Czech Airlines moved their headquarters to the Smartwings building at Prague airport.

Former subsidiaries

Czech Airlines Handling provided ground handling or passenger and aircraft handling for many airlines operating flights from Prague.
Czech Airlines Technics provided aircraft maintenance and regular certified servicing for the Czech Airlines fleet and other airlines.
Czech Aviation Training Centre provided training to future aircrew members, as well as refresher and further training to existing crews operated by the state-owned enterprise Air Navigation Services of the Czech Republic. In addition to Czech Airlines, services of the training centre were also used by other airlines. Furthermore, "Flying without Fear" and "Stewardess/Steward Try-outs" courses were offered, as well as the "Flying for Fun" adventure course. These special trainings were also open to the public.
Holidays Czech Airlines, a defunct charter subsidiary, focused mainly on flying to holiday destinations such as Greece, Turkey and Spain. The airline launched on 1 June 2010, and ceased in July 2014.

Financial results
Since its transformation to a joint-stock company in August 1992, ČSA has never paid dividends. The sale of a minority share to Air France was a fiasco, and the French airline withdrew. Subsequently, Antonín Jakubše and Miroslav Kůla stabilized the company and enlarged its fleet. In September 2003, Miroslav Kůla was fired. New CEO and ex-minister Jaroslav Tvrdík agreed with the unions to increase wages by a third and announced an "unprecedented" enlargement of the fleet.

In 2005, the financial situation sharply deteriorated. Although the sale of two ATR aircraft improved operating results by CZK 198 million, the operating loss was almost half a billion Czech crowns and the Government of Jiří Paroubek replaced Jaroslav Tvrdík with Radomír Lašák. The airline generated further operating losses, despite revenues of CZK 2.1 bn from the sale of almost all real estate and CZK 1.2 bn from aircraft sales. In 2005–2010, ČSA generated an operating loss of CZK 3.4 bn; without long-term asset sale revenues, the operating loss would have been twice as large. The gross margin did not even cover personnel expenses.

In 2016, the airline handled 2.7 million passengers and announced a net profit of 241 million crowns.

Corporate identity

Logo
A new look for Czech Airlines was revealed in September 2007. The new logo was created by Michal Kotyza, who works for the airline.

Livery

Destinations

As of February 2021, Czech Airlines serves four scheduled year-round and seasonal destinations including their home base at Václav Havel Airport Prague. This figure is down from 33 routes in summer 2019. Flights are operated mainly in Europe, with Beirut being the sole remaining Middle Eastern destination. Via its codeshare partners, ČSA offers more than 110 destinations and 45 countries from Prague.

Codeshare agreements
Czech Airlines codeshares with the following airlines:

 Aeroflot
 Aeroméxico
 Air Europa
 Air France
 Air Malta
 airBaltic
 Azerbaijan Airlines
 Belavia
 Bulgaria Air
 China Airlines
 China Southern Airlines
 Delta Air Lines
 Etihad Airways
 Finnair
 Hainan Airlines
 Iberia
 KLM
 Korean Air
 Middle East Airlines
 Saudia
 TAROM
 Smartwings
 Ural Airlines
 Vietnam Airlines
 Vueling

Charter flights
In June 2007, ČSA signed a contract with Exim Tours, the largest Czech travel agency, extending their contract for another three years. In May 2010, ČSA withdrew its last Airbus A310 used for these services.

Fleet

Current fleet
, the Czech Airlines fleet consists of the following aircraft:

Historical fleet
Czech or Czechoslovak Airlines operated these aircraft types in the past:

Services

Catering
Czech Airlines offers buy on board service on some flights in addition to free service.

Frequent-flyer program
The OK Plus frequent flyer programme gives passengers "OK Plus Miles" for flights with Czech Airlines, SkyTeam member airlines, other partner airlines or non-airline partners such as hotels, car rentals, banks etc. OK Plus membership cards are available with the following tier levels: OK Plus membership, OK Plus Silver, OK Plus Gold, and OK Plus Platinum. The higher the card level, the greater the number of benefits passengers receive.

Accidents and incidents

Fatal accidents
 On August 12, 1930, a ČSA Ford 5-AT-C Trimotor (registration OK-FOR) crashed near Jihlava (Iglau) while attempting to avoid a thunderstorm. The aircraft struck the ground in poor visibility after a sharp turn to avoid a chimney and caught fire, killing 12 of 13 on board.
 On August 13, 1938, a ČSA Savoia-Marchetti S.73 (registration OK-BAG) struck a wooded mountain near Oberkirch on approach to Strasbourg en route from Prague via Paris, killing all 17 on board, the stewardess survived, but died a day later.
 On March 5, 1946, a ČSA Junkers Ju 52/3m (registration OK-ZDN) crashed near Prague after two landing attempts, killing 10 of 15 on board. The aircraft was operating a Paris-Strasbourg-Prague passenger service.
 On February 13, 1947, a ČSA Douglas C-47A (registration OK-XDU) crashed shortly after takeoff from Ruzyne Airport while on a training flight, killing all three on board; improper maintenance was blamed, leading to a five-day crew strike.
 On December 21, 1948, ČSA Flight 584 (a Douglas C-47A, registration OK-WDN) struck a hillside near Pilos, Greece in bad weather, killing all 24 on board. Other reports state the aircraft was shot down after the pilot lit a flare or crashed into the hill while dropping weapons for communist insurgents. The aircraft was operating a passenger service from Czechoslovakia to Israel with stops at Rome and Athens.
 On February 27, 1950, a ČSA Douglas C-47A (registration OK-WDY) struck Praded Mountain en route to Prague from Ostrava, killing six of 25 on board.
 On January 12, 1954, a ČSA Douglas C-47A (registration OK-WDS) struck a chimney and power lines and crashed near Prague after nearly failing to take off, killing all 13 on board.
 On January 18, 1956, a ČSA Douglas C-47A (registration OK-WDZ) struck Mount Skapova after the aircraft was blown off course by strong winds, killing 22 of 26 on board.
 On November 24, 1956, a ČSA Ilyushin Il-12 (registration OK-DBP) crashed into a field near Egislau, Switzerland, killing all 23 on board.
 On January 2, 1961, a ČSA Avia 14 (registration OK-MCZ) crashed on climbout from Prague during a pilot training flight after failing to gain height on takeoff, killing all 10 on board.
 On March 28, 1961, ČSA Flight 511 (an Ilyushin Il-18V) crashed in Gräfenberg near Nürnberg during a Prague-Zurich service due to structural failure, killing all 52 on board.
 On July 12, 1961, ČSA Flight 511 (an Ilyushin Il-18V, registration OK-PAF) crashed near Anfa Airport due to possible crew error, killing all 72 on board.
 On October 10, 1962, ČSA Flight 306 (an Avia 14, registration OK-MCT) crashed near Slavkov while on approach to Brno, killing 13 of 42 on board.
 On September 5, 1967, ČSA Flight 523, an Ilyushin Il-18D (registration OK-WAI), crashed on climbout from Gander International Airport while on a Prague-Shannon-Gander-Havana passenger service, killing 37 of 69 on board; the cause was never determined.
 On October 11, 1968, a ČSA Avia 14-32A (registration OK-MCJ, named Svit Gottwaldov) crashed near Ptice shortly after takeoff from Prague, killing 11 of 40 on board.
 On June 1, 1970, a ČSA Tupolev Tu-104A (registration OK-NDD, named Plzen) crashed after two attempted approaches to Tripoli International Airport, killing all 13 on board.
 On August 20, 1975 ČSA Flight 540, an Ilyushin Il-62 (registration OK-DBF, named Brno Trade Fair) flew into the ground during a night-time approach to Damascus International Airport due to a mis-understanding between the pilots and the control tower that resulted in an incorrect altimeter setting, killing 126 of 128 on board in Syria's worst ever air disaster.
 On July 28, 1976, ČSA Flight 001, an Ilyushin Il-18V (registration OK-NAB, named Košice), which was operating as a scheduled domestic passenger flight from Prague's Ruzyně airport to Bratislava-Ivanka Airport, both in Czechoslovakia, crashed into the Zlaté Piesky (Golden Sands) lake while attempting to land in Bratislava. All 6 crew members and 70 out of 73 passengers died.
 On February 11, 1977, a ČSA Avia 14T (registration OK-OCA) struck trees and crashed near Ivanka Airport due to crew error, killing four of five on board. This is ČSA's last fatal accident.

Non-fatal accidents
 On November 9, 1946, a ČSA Douglas C-47A (registration OK-XDG) force-landed near Dobrovíz after running out of fuel while in a holding pattern due to bad weather; all 18 on board survived, but the aircraft was written off.
 On December 24, 1946, a ČSA Douglas C-47A (registration OK-WDD) was written off following an emergency landing near Paris; all 15 on board survived.
 On January 25, 1947, a ČSA Douglas C-47A (registration OK-WDB) was struck by a crashing Douglas Dakota while parked at Croydon Airport; there were no casualties, but the aircraft was written off. See 1947 Croydon Dakota accident.
 On March 16, 1963, a ČSA Tupolev Tu-104A (registration OK-LDB) caught fire and burned out while being refueled at Santa Cruz Airport, India; no casualties except for a flight attendant who was injured after jumping from the plane.
 On August 18, 1970, ČSA Flight 744, a Tupolev Tu-124V (registration OK-TEB, named Centrotex), landed wheels-up at Kloten Airport after the crew became preoccupied with cabin pressurization problems; all 20 on board survived, but the aircraft was written off.
 On August 29, 1973, ČSA Flight 531, a Tupolev Tu-104A (registration OK-MDE) slid off the runway while landing at Nicosia Airport; all 70 on board survived, but the aircraft was written off.
 On January 2, 1977, a ČSA Tupolev Tu-134A (registration OK-CFD) collided on the runway at Ruzyne Airport with a ČSA Ilyushin Il-18 (OK-NAA) that was taking off; all 48 on board the Tu-134 survived, but it was written off; the Il-18 (all six on board survived) was substantially damaged but was repaired and returned to service, it was retired in 1981 and is now in a museum.
 On October 11, 1988, a ČSA Tupolev Tu-134A (registration OK-AFB) landed hard at Ruzyne Airport; there were no casualties, but the aircraft was written off and flown to Piešťany where it served as a restaurant.
 On June 9, 2012, a Czech Airlines ATR 42-500 (registration OK-KFM) was destroyed in a hangar explosion and fire at Ruzyne International Airport. A second ATR 42 (OK-JFK) was also damaged by the fire. Two Czech Airlines Technics employees were working with an explosive liquid. The liquid was sucked into a heavy technic vehicle, which then blew up near the aircraft and caused the fire.

Hijackings
 On April 6, 1948, a ČSA Douglas DC-3 was hijacked to Neubiberg Air Base, Germany by 20 people wishing to escape Communist rule in Czechoslovakia.
 On March 24, 1950, three Douglas DC-3s from Czechoslovakia were simultaneously hijacked. All three aircraft landed at the US Air Force Base at Erding, West Germany. In all, 26 of 85 passengers chose to stay in West Germany to escape Communist rule in Czechoslovakia.
 On March 23, 1952, a ČSA Douglas C-47 was hijacked by four people who demanded to be taken to Germany. The aircraft landed safely at Frankfurt with no casualties.

References

Citations

Bibliography

External links 

 
Airlines of the Czech Republic
Airlines of Czechoslovakia
Airlines established in 1923
1923 establishments in Czechoslovakia
Association of European Airlines members
Companies based in Prague
Companies of Czechoslovakia
Czech brands
Government-owned airlines
SkyTeam